The Hungarian Party of the Unemployed (MMNP) was an extra-parliamentary political party in Hungary, existed officially between 1993 and 2004. It contested the 1994 parliamentary election with only one candidate, László Mercz in Miskolc, who gained 190 votes. The MMNP did not contest any further elections, the party became technically defunct.

Election results

National Assembly

References

Sources

Defunct political parties in Hungary
Political parties established in 1993
Political parties disestablished in 2004
1993 establishments in Hungary
2004 disestablishments in Hungary